Madison Square Garden (1879–1890) was an arena in New York City at the northeast corner of East 26th Street and Madison Avenue in Manhattan.  The first venue to use that name, it seated 10,000 spectators. It was replaced with a new building on the same site.

Origins

The site upon which Madison Square Garden was eventually established was originally occupied by a small passenger depot of the New York and Harlem Railroad. The site was vacated by the railroad in 1871 when it moved operations uptown to Grand Central Depot at 42nd Street.

In 1876, the arena was leased to band leader Patrick Gilmore, who renamed it Gilmore's Garden and presented flower shows, beauty contests, music concerts, temperance and revival meetings, walking marathons, and the first Westminster Kennel Club Dog Show, called at the time (1877) the "First Annual N.Y. Bench Show." Gilmore also presented boxing, but since competitive boxing matches were technically illegal at the time, he called them "exhibitions" or "illustrated lectures."

The next to lease the space was W. M. Tileston, who was an official of the dog show. He attempted to attract a more genteel crowd with tennis, a riding school and an ice carnival; the arena had one of the first indoor ice rinks in the United States.

Naming
After the death of Commodore Vanderbilt, who owned the site, his grandson William Kissam Vanderbilt took back control and announced on May 31, 1879, that the arena was to be renamed "Madison Square Garden." Vanderbilt presented sporting events such as indoor track and field meets, a convention of Elks, the National Horse Show and more boxing, including some bouts featuring John L. Sullivan, who began a four-year series of exhibitions in July 1882, drawing over-capacity crowds. P.T. Barnum also used the Garden to exhibit Jumbo, the elephant he had bought from the London Zoo; he drew sufficient business to recover the $10,000 pricetag.

Another notable use of the first Garden was as a velodrome, an oval bicycle racing track with banked curves.  At the time, bicycle racing was one of the biggest sports in the country. "[The] top riders [were] among the sports stars of their day. The bike races at Madison Square Garden were all the rage around the turn of the 20th century." Madison Square Garden was the most important bicycle racing track in the United States and the Olympic discipline known as the Madison is named after the original Garden.

However, the Garden was hot in the summertime and freezing in the wintertime. It had a leaky roof and dangerous balconies that had collapsed resulting in deaths. Vanderbilt eventually sold what Harper's Weekly called his "patched-up, grimy, drafty, combustible old shell" to a syndicate that included J. P. Morgan, Andrew Carnegie, James Stillman and W. W. Astor, who closed it to build a new arena designed by noted architect Stanford White.  Demolition began in July 1889, and the second Madison Square Garden, which cost more than a half-million dollars to build, opened on June 6, 1890. It was demolished in 1926, and the New York Life Building, designed by Cass Gilbert and completed in 1928, replaced it on the site.

See also
 Madison Square
 Madison Square Garden (1890)
 Madison Square Garden (1925)
 Madison Square Garden (1968)
 Madison Square Garden Bowl

References

External links

Arena information
P.T. Barnum – Ultrarunning Promoter (1874)

.1879
Former music venues in New York City
Former sports venues in New York City
Demolished buildings and structures in Manhattan
Demolished sports venues in New York (state)
Defunct boxing venues in the United States
Boxing venues in New York City
Defunct concert halls in the United States
Defunct indoor arenas in New York City
Defunct sports venues in Manhattan
Music venues in Manhattan
Cycle racing in the United States
Indoor track and field venues in New York (state)
Tennis venues in New York City
Velodromes in New York City
Railway stations in the United States opened in 1874
Sports venues completed in 1874
1870s architecture in the United States
Buildings and structures demolished in 1890
American companies established in 1879
Entertainment companies established in 1879
1879 establishments in New York (state)
1890 disestablishments in New York (state)